The Santa Tereza River is a river of Tocantins and Goiás states in central Brazil.

See also
List of rivers of Goiás
List of rivers of Tocantins

References
Brazilian Ministry of Transport

Rivers of Goiás
Rivers of Tocantins